Doogie may refer to:

 Doogie Howser, M.D., an American medical drama that ran for four seasons on ABC
 Doogie Kameāloha, M.D., an American family medical comedy-drama developed by Kourtney Kang
 Doogie White (born 1960), Scottish rock vocalist

See also
 Dougie, a hip-hop dance
 Dougie (given name)